Christian Richardt (25 May 1831 in Copenhagen - 18 December 1892) was a Danish writer.  He wrote the libretto for the opera Drot og marsk by Peter Heise.

Sources
The following sources were given:
Digte m.m. i Kalliope
Biografi på Arkiv for dansk litteratur
Danske Stormænd fra de seneste aarhundreder af L F La Cour og Knud Fabricius, 1912

External links
 

1831 births
1892 deaths
Danish male dramatists and playwrights
Opera librettists
19th-century Danish dramatists and playwrights
19th-century male writers